Raül Agné Montull (born 24 May 1970) is a Spanish retired footballer who played as a central defender, currently a manager.

Playing career
Born in Mequinenza, Province of Zaragoza, Aragon, Agné never competed in higher than Segunda División B during his 14-year senior career. He represented CD Mequinenza, Deportivo Aragón, Girona FC (two stints), UE Figueres, CD Binéfar, Palamós CF, retiring in 2004 at the age of 34.

Agné shared teams with his twin brother Vidal whilst with Binéfar, and also acted as manager to the youth sides.

Coaching career
Agné began his coaching career at CF Peralada one year after retiring, missing out on promotion from Tercera División in his first season. In 2006, he was appointed at former club Palamós, leaving the following year.

In June 2007, Agné signed with Girona. After leading the team to Segunda División promotion in the play-offs, he was dismissed on 18 May 2009 after a bad run of results.

Agné moved to Recreativo de Huelva on 1 December 2009, resigning on 14 June of the following year due to "personal reasons". He returned to Girona the following summer, taking them to a comfortable mid-table finish in the second division in his debut campaign and subsequently renewing for two years; he was relieved of his duties, however, on 15 January 2012.

On 10 December 2012, Agné joined Cádiz CF as the club neared the relegation zone in the third tier. He was sacked on 18 March 2014, with the side still in that league.

Agné was named CD Tenerife manager on 3 February 2015, taking over from Álvaro Cervera at the second division team. On 3 November, after 31 competitive games – one in the Copa del Rey – he was dismissed.

After nearly one year of inactivity, Agné replaced the fired Luis Milla at the helm of Real Zaragoza. On 19 March 2017, he too was sacked.

Agné moved abroad for the first time in December 2017, when he took the job at Nei Mongol Zhongyou F.C. of China League One. He and compatriot assistant Arnau Sala left the following August, with the team second-bottom.

In October 2019, Agné replaced Enrique Martín at the helm of third-tier Córdoba CF for the rest of the season with the option of a second. He lasted only until 10 March, when he himself was replaced by Juan Sabas.

On 28 May 2021, Agné was named manager of Gimnàstic de Tarragona of the newly formed Primera División RFEF. After missing out promotion in the last round of the play-offs, he was dismissed on 15 January 2023, with the club in the 12th position of the 2022–23 Primera Federación.

Personal life
Whilst at the service of Girona, Agné walked out of a press conference in February 2011 following an away game against SD Huesca after not being allowed to express himself in Catalan. This sparked a wave of solidarity on the internet, and Catalan essayist Quim Monzó wrote an opinion piece on the subject for La Vanguardia under the title "! تحيا كاتالونيا حرة" (Arabic translation of the independentist slogan Visca Catalunya Lliure! – Long Live Free Catalonia!).

Managerial statistics

References

External links

1970 births
Living people
People from Bajo Cinca
Spanish twins
Twin sportspeople
Sportspeople from the Province of Huesca
Spanish footballers
Footballers from Aragon
Association football defenders
Segunda División B players
Tercera División players
Real Zaragoza B players
Girona FC players
UE Figueres footballers
CD Binéfar players
Palamós CF footballers
Spanish football managers
Segunda División managers
Segunda División B managers
Primera Federación managers
Tercera División managers
Palamós CF managers
Girona FC managers
Recreativo de Huelva managers
Cádiz CF managers
CD Tenerife managers
Real Zaragoza managers
Córdoba CF managers
Gimnàstic de Tarragona managers
China League One managers
Spanish expatriate football managers
Expatriate football managers in China
Spanish expatriate sportspeople in China